Bush presidential pardons could refer to: 

List of people pardoned by George H. W. Bush
List of people pardoned by George W. Bush